The 2013–14 Senior Women's One Day League was the 8th edition of the women's List A cricket competition in India. It took place in December 2013, with 26 teams divided into an Elite Group and a Plate Group. Railways won the tournament, their second in a row and seventh overall, by topping the Elite Group Super League.

Competition format
The 26 teams competing in the tournament were divided into the Elite Group and the Plate Group, with the 10 teams in the Elite Group further divided into Groups A and B and the 16 teams in the Plate Group into Groups A, B and C. The tournament operated on a round-robin format, with each team playing every other team in their group once. The top two sides from each Elite Group progressed to the Elite Group Super League, which was a further round-robin group, with the winner of the group being crowned Champions. The bottom side from each Elite Group was relegated to the Plate Group for the following season. Meanwhile, the top two from each Plate Group progressed to a knockout stage, with the two teams that reached the final being promoted for the following season, as well as playing off for the Plate Group title. Matches were played using a 50 over format.

The groups worked on a points system with positions with the groups being based on the total points. Points were awarded as follows:

Win: 4 points. 
Tie: 2 points. 
Loss: 0 points. 
No Result/Abandoned: 2 points.

If points in the final table are equal, teams are separated by most wins, then head-to-head record, then Net Run Rate.

Elite Group

Elite Group A

Elite Group B

Elite Group Super League

Plate Group

Plate Group A

Plate Group B

Plate Group C

 Advanced to Plate Group Semi-finals
 Advanced to Plate Group Quarter-finals

Source:CricketArchive

Knockout stage

Quarter-finals

Semi-finals

Final

Statistics

Most runs

Source: CricketArchive

Most wickets

Source: CricketArchive

References

Women's Senior One Day Trophy
Senior Women's One Day League
Senior Women's One Day League